also known as The 6th Sayoko is a Japanese television series  which was produced in the year 2000.

Story
Nishihama Junior High School is haunted by the legend of Sayoko. Every three years a student is chosen to play the role of Sayoko by his or her predecessor. Sayoko has three missions to accomplish. If they are completed it is to the advantage of the school. If not, the school is doomed... Shu has been chosen to be Sayoko. Disbelieving the legend, Shu lets his pal Rei assume the role. But, when the new term begins, one of the tasks has already been completed. By whom? This is just the prelude to a string of spooky happenings. "Sayoko is Back" is no ordinary horror story. The youngsters explore the unknown while caught up in the drama of adolescence. It is an occasionally frightening but ultimately heart-warming journey that they undertake.

Cast
Anne Suzuki as Rei Shioda
Chiaki Kuriyama as Sayoko Tsumura
Takayuki Yamada as Shū Sekine
Ryō Katsuji as Yukio Karasawa
Marika Matsumoto as Masako Hanamiya
Yuka Hirata as Tōko Hirabayashi
Masato Furuoya as Takao Karasawa
Sae Isshiki as Mikako Sano 
Jun Miho as Mayumi Shioda
Takehiro Murata as Mr. Kurokawa
Yumi Takigawa as Chika Sekine
Manami Fuji as Yurie Tsumura
Hinako Sano as The little girl
Ayumi Ikeda as The silhouette of Sayoko

Episodes
The entire series consists of 12 episodes in all.

Episode 1: Nazo no tenkosei
Episode 2: Borei
Episode 3: Mie nai teki
Episode 4: Nazo no massage
Episode 5: Fushigi na utagoe
Episode 6: Tanabata no himitsu
Episode 7: Wana
Episode 8: Kyofu no bunkasai part 1
Episode 9: Kyofu no bunkasai part 2
Episode 10: Sayoko ha koko ni iru
Episode 11: Sayoko no shotai
Episode 12: Soshite tobira ga hiraku

References

2000 films
2000 drama films
2000s Japanese-language films
Japanese drama television series
2000s Japanese films